Yamaha Lexam is a motorcycle manufactured and designed for the Southeast Asia market by Yamaha Motor Vietnam. Lexam is an underbone and uses the  Yamaha Compact Automatic Transmission (Y-CAT), a compact CVT transmission with chain. It was introduced in 2009 for the Vietnamese market and planned to be introduced in 2010 for the Indonesian market.

External links
Official website
Lexam Yamaha Indonesia

Lexam